Westher is a surname. Notable people with the surname include:

 Erling Westher (1903–1986), Norwegian pianist and educator
 Paula Westher (born 1965), Swedish cyclist
  (born 1944), Norwegian pianist